is the debut single of the J-pop singer Aya Matsuura, who started her career as a Hello! Project solo artist with this song at age 14. It was released on April 11, 2001, under the Zetima label and reached place 10 in the Oricon charts and charted for six weeks, selling 72,070 copies.

It was also re-recorded in 2006 for her "Naked Songs" album. This album included arrangements with a Studio Brass Section and more acoustic rhythm section.

Track listing
All lyrics are written by Tsunku.
 
 
 "Dokki Doki! Love Mail" (Instrumental)

Music video
In the music video Matsuura Aya is shown singing in different places:
dancing before a colorful painting
standing and sitting on a small flying earth
walking and dancing between small model skyscrapers (she later puts flowers on them)
watching excited as flying ice creams pass
jumping around in a room full of balloons
being with two small versions of herself, one as angel, on as devil, who later turn into an army of devils and angels
she with a dozen clones of her on small spaceships
she giving her paper work to a robot (played by herself), who is shown doing the work for her
on several TV screens all over big cities

References

External links
 Dokki Doki! Love Mail entry on the Up-Front Works official website

Aya Matsuura songs
Zetima Records singles
2001 singles
Songs written by Tsunku
Song recordings produced by Tsunku
2001 songs